Efstathios Alexandris (Amfissa, April 7, 1921 – July 20, 2013) was a Greek politician, lawyer and member of the Panhellenic Socialist Movement. Alexandris was a member of the Hellenic Parliament from 1977 to 1989. He also served as the Minister of Justice of Greece from October 21, 1981, to July 5, 1982, as well as Minister for Mercantile Marine from 26 July 1985 to 23 September 1987.

Alexandris died in Athens, Greece, on July 20, 2013, at the age of 92.

References

1921 births
2013 deaths
Ministers for Mercantile Marine of Greece
Greek MPs 1977–1981
Greek MPs 1981–1985
Greek MPs 1985–1989
PASOK politicians
20th-century Greek lawyers
Justice ministers of Greece
People from Amfissa